Christian Weir (born September 24, 2006) is an American racing driver. He currently competes in the U.S. F2000 National Championship with Turn 3 Motorsport.

Career

U.S. F2000 National Championship 
In 2021, Weir would make his debut in the series at the Mid-Ohio round with Turn 3 Motorsport and contest the rest of the season.

On December 2, 2021, it was announced that Weir would run full-time in 2022 once again with Turn 3 Motorsport.

Racing record

Career summary 

*Season still in progress.

American open-wheel racing results

U.S. F2000 National Championship 
(key) (Races in bold indicate pole position) (Races in italics indicate fastest lap) (Races with * indicate most race laps led)

*Season still in progress.

References 

2006 births
Living people
Racing drivers from Illinois
U.S. F2000 National Championship drivers

United States F4 Championship drivers